Caleb Russell Carrick (August 6, 1889 – September 13, 1955) was an American football player and coach. He served as the head football coach at the University of Buffalo from 1924 to 1928, compiling a record of 5–31–2.

Head coaching record

References

External links
 

1889 births
1955 deaths
Buffalo Bulls football coaches
Colgate Raiders football players
Players of American football from Buffalo, New York